Meet Cute is a 2022 Indian Telugu-language Anthology Drama streaming television series written and directed by debutant Deepthi Ganta for SonyLIV. The series stars Adah Sharma, Sathyaraj, Ashwin Kumar Lakshmikanthan, Ruhani Sharma, Aakanksha Singh, Shiva Kandukuri and Sanchitha Poonacha in lead roles. Vijay Bulganin has composed the music and is produced by Nani and Pranshanthi Tipirneni under 'Wall Poster Cinema' banner. The trailer for the series was released on 18th November and series premiered on 25th November 2022 and was very well received by critics and appreciated by audience.

Plot 
Charming first encounters leads to new experiences and pleasant discoveries in this heart-warming anthology series. Swathi, Saru, Padma, Shalini and Anjana's meet-cutes open them up to whole new perspective on life.

Cast

Meet The Boy 

 Ashwin Kumar Lakshmikanthan as Abhi
 Varsha Bollamma as Swathi
 Srividya P as Ninu
 Sameer Malla as Pavan, Ninu's boyfriend

Old Is Gold 

 Ruhani Sharma as Saroja 'Saru' 'Sarojamma'
 Sathyaraj as Mohan Rao, Retired journalist
 Raja Chembolu as Jai, Saru's husband

In L(aw)ove 

 Aakanksha Singh as Pooja
 Dheekshith Shetty as Siddharth
 Rohini as Padma, Siddharth's mother
 Surekha Vani as Lakshmi, Padma's friend
 Sripriya Iduri as Divya, Pooja's friend

Star Struck 

 Shiva Kandukuri as Aman
 Adah Sharma as Shalini
 Alekhya Harika as Meera, Shalini's stylist

Ex-Girlfriend 

 Sanchitha Poonacha as Anjana
 Sunainaa as Kiran
 Govind Padmasoorya as Ajay
 Kivish as Pavan, Anjana's brother
 Kalyani Natarajan as Sashikala, Anjana's mother
 DD Srinivas as Ramesh, Kiran's father

Episodes

Reception 
The series opened to a mixed reviews from India Today, Mirchi9, and The Hindu's Sangeetha Devi wrote "‘Meet Cute’ is a mixed bag, with a few standout stories and other cheerful".

References

External links 

 
 Meet Cute on SonyLIV

SonyLIV original programming
Sony Pictures Networks India
Indian drama television series
Indian drama web series
2022 web series debuts
Telugu-language web series